Elephantopus nudatus, common name smooth elephantsfoot, is a North American species of flowering plant in the sunflower family. It is native to the southeastern United States from eastern Texas to Delaware.

Elephantopus nudatus is a perennial herb up to 110 cm (44 inches) tall. Leaves are oblanceolate to spatulate, up to 20 cm (8 inches) long, darker on the upper side than they are on the lower side. The plant produces numerous small flower heads in a tight cluster, each head generally containing only 4-5 florets.

References

External links
Digital Atlas of the Virginia Flora
Alabama Plant Atlas

Vernonieae
Plants described in 1879
Flora of the Southeastern United States
Flora without expected TNC conservation status